Sir Hercules Langrishe, 1st Baronet (1729 – 1 February 1811) was an Irish politician.

Life and career 
He was the only son of Robert Langrishe of Knocktopher, County Kilkenny and Anne Whitby, daughter of Jonathan Whitby of Kilcreggan, and educated at Trinity College, Dublin, where he graduated B.A. in 1763. He was a commissioner of barracks 1766–74, supervisor of accounts 1767–75, commissioner of revenue 1774–1801, and commissioner of excise 1780–1801. After the Act of Union 1800 he played no further role in politics.

He was first elected to represent Knocktopher in the Irish House of Commons in May 1761, and sat until he resigned his seat in March 1800. In 1776 he was also returned for Callan, but was declared not duly elected. He was strongly attached to the "unreformed" Parliament, but also supported Henry Grattan in his move to make it genuinely independent of the British Parliament.

He was a strong supporter of relaxation of the Penal Laws against Catholics, and was one of the principal sponsors of the Catholic Relief Act 1793. His views are said to have been influenced by his lifelong friendship with Edmund Burke, who wrote an open "Letter to  Sir H. Langrishe" in 1792, encouraging his efforts to secure relief for Catholics from the rigours of the Penal Laws.

On 19 February 1777 he was created a Baronet, of Knocktopher, County Kilkenny, in the Baronetage of Ireland. On 27 February 1792, he was appointed to the Irish Privy Council. Though he frequently supported the Government in the Commons, he prided himself on his independence of mind. He was noted for his wide culture and personal charm.

In Dublin, he was a member of Daly's Club.

Family 
He married Hannah, the daughter and coheiress of Robert Myhill of Killerney, County Kilkenny, and sister of Jane Myhill, who married  Charles Loftus, 1st  Marquess of Ely. He and Hannah had two sons and three daughters. The elder son Robert succeeded as second baronet, and died in 1835, having sat in the Irish parliament as M.P. for Knocktopher from 1796 to 1800. The second son James was archdeacon of Glendalough, dean of Achonry, and rector of Newcastle Lyons, and Killishin, County Carlow. Langrishe's daughter Elizabeth married the Reverend Christopher Robinson, Rector of Granard, only son of the eminent judge Christopher Robinson and had several children, including Sir Bryan Robinson, who was a judge like his grandfather, and Admiral Hercules Robinson, father of Hercules  Robinson, 1st Baron Rosmead.

Hercules Langrishe was the great-great-grandfather of Lt Col John Du Plessis Langrishe FRSE.

Arms

References

 https://web.archive.org/web/20090601105535/http://www.leighrayment.com/commons/irelandcommons.htm
 
 

1729 births
1811 deaths
Irish MPs 1761–1768
Irish MPs 1769–1776
Irish MPs 1776–1783
Irish MPs 1783–1790
Irish MPs 1790–1797
Irish MPs 1798–1800
Baronets in the Baronetage of Ireland
Hercules
Members of the Privy Council of Ireland
Members of the Parliament of Ireland (pre-1801) for County Kilkenny constituencies